Andrea Elena Ulmeanu (born 15 May 1984) is a retired  Romanian artistic gymnast. She is a gold world medalist with the team (2001).

External links
 Unofficial website (Archived 2009-10-25)
 

1985 births
Living people
Sportspeople from Timișoara
Romanian female artistic gymnasts
Medalists at the World Artistic Gymnastics Championships
21st-century Romanian women